Liam Durcan is a Canadian neurologist at the Montreal Neurological Hospital and an Assistant Professor at McGill University. He has published three books, A Short Journey by Car (Véhicule Press 2004), Garcia's Heart (McClelland & Stewart 2008), and The Measure of Darkness (Bellevue Literary Press 2016). A Winnipeg native, Durcan also lived in Detroit briefly as a child, but has been at the Montreal Neurological Institute since 1994.

Writing 
Garcia’s Heart (McClelland & Stewart 2008) is Durcan's first novel about Patrick, who is a medical industry entrepreneur. Patrick grew up in Montreal, and through an act of graffiti tagging, got in touch with Hernan Garcia, who ran a corner store or dépanneur. As the story unfolds, we find that Garcia was a doctor in Central America prior to arriving in Montreal. Garcia did work for a Central American government that has him on trial at the International Court of Justice at The Hague. Patrick attends Garcia's trial trying to sort out his feelings for his former mentor in light of the new evidence. This gets complicated when Garcia's daughter appears, as she was Patrick's first girlfriend. Garcia's Heart won the 2008 Arthur Ellis Award for best first novel.

The Measure of Darkness (Bellevue Literary Press 2016) is Durcan's second novel, and describes the life of an architect, Martin, who has suffered neglect and a severe brain injury as a result of a car accident. Martin cannot remember events from the days leading up to his accident, and neglect is reflected in Martin's relations with his family. He's twice divorced and estranged from his two daughters, even though one is an architect at the firm he founded. Moreover, Martin hasn't seen his brother in decades, yet it's the brother who comes to help him during his convalescence. While recovering, Martin recalls researching Konstantin Melnikov, a Russian architect during the Soviet era, during his undergraduate days. Martin and his supervising professor even visited Melnikov in Moscow. Thoughts of Melnikov help pull Martin through his recovery. Of the novel, Durcan said "there was a story that I needed to tell, perhaps just for myself."

A Short Journey by Car (Véhicule Press 2004) was chosen as one of The Globe and Mail's Top 100 books of 2004.Quill & Quire says of Durcan, "even when he’s falling flat, Durcan is a smooth and confident writer. Some hit-and-miss is inevitable in a collection of this breadth, and Short Journey’s good stuff bodes well for the author’s future work."

Durcan's short fiction has been published in The Fiddlehead, Zoetrope, The Antigonish Review, and Maisonneuve.

Awards 
Durcan won the 2004 QWF/CBC Quebec short story competition for Kick (published in A Short Journey by Car), has been nominated for the Journey Prize, and was long-listed for the 2009 Dublin IMPAC prize  for his debut novel, Garcia’s Heart.

References

External links 
 YouTube | Book Lounge Video Featuring Garcia's Heart by Liam Durcan
 
 OpenBook Toronto Review of Garcia's Heart
 Montreal Gazette interview with Durcan discussing The Measure of Darkness

Canadian neurologists
Living people
Canadian male novelists
Canadian male short story writers
21st-century Canadian novelists
21st-century Canadian short story writers
Writers from Montreal
21st-century Canadian male writers
Year of birth missing (living people)